Risoba avola is a species of moth of the family Nolidae first described by George Thomas Bethune-Baker in 1906.

Distribution
It is found in Borneo, Sumatra, the Philippines and New Guinea.

Subspecies
Risoba avola avola Bethune-Baker, 1906
Risoba avola magna A. E. Prout, 1922

References

Nolidae
Moths described in 1906